Sadiq Abubakar Daba, known simply as Sadiq Daba (1951/52 – 3 March 2021) was a Nigerian actor and broadcaster. In 2015, he won Africa Movie Academy Award for Best Actor for his role as "Inspector Waziri" in October 1.

Education 
He had his secondary education at St. Edward's Secondary School. He got higher degrees in many institutions including Ahmadu Bello University in Zaria.

Career 
Daba has worked as a broadcaster for Nigerian Television Authority. His acting career came to prominence in the late 1970s, starring in Cockcrow at Dawn. 

In 2018 he was given the title “Garkuwan Nollywood,” (when translated from Hausa language it means "Shield of Nollywood" by the stakeholders in the industry.

Cancer diagnosis and death
Daba announced his diagnosis of leukemia and prostate cancer in 2017 and was supported with fundraising by several Nigerians including Josephine Obiajulu Odumakin, Mabeloboh Center For Save Our Stars(MOCSOS). On 3 February 2018, Daba joined Project Pink Blue
to walk against cancer to commemorate World Cancer Day.

Death 
He died on 3 March 2021 at the Ayinke General hospital in Ikeja, Lagos. His last movie was in 'Citation', a film by Kunle Afolayan which was released in 2020.

See also
 List of Nigerian film producers

References

1950s births
Year of birth uncertain
2021 deaths
20th-century Nigerian male actors
Nigerian broadcasters
Nigerian film producers
Ahmadu Bello University alumni
Best Actor Africa Movie Academy Award winners
AMVCA Industry Merit Award winners
21st-century Nigerian male actors
Deaths from leukemia
Deaths from prostate cancer
Deaths from cancer in Nigeria
Nigerian male television actors
Nigerian media personalities
Nigerian television presenters
Nigerian television personalities